Minuscule 628 (in the Gregory-Aland numbering), α 400 (von Soden), is a Greek–Latin diglot minuscule manuscript of the New Testament, on paper. Palaeographically it has been assigned to the 14th century. The manuscript is lacunose. Formerly it was labeled by 161a, 198p, and 69r.

Description 

The codex contains the text of the New Testament except the four Gospels, on 216 paper leaves (size ), with lacunae at the beginning and end (Acts 1:1-2:27; Revelation 18:22-22:21). It is written in two columns per page, 30-32 lines per page. Text Greek and Latin in parallel columns. It contains Prolegomena, and subscriptions at the end of each book.

The order of books: Acts of the Apostles, Catholic epistles, Pauline epistles, and Book of Revelation. Epistle to the Hebrews is placed after Epistle to Philemon.

Text 

The Greek text of the codex is a representative of the Byzantine text-type. Kurt Aland placed it in Category V.

History 

Scrivener dated the manuscript to the 13th century, Gregory and Aland to the 14th century. Actually it is dated by the INTF to the 14th century.

The manuscript was added to the list of New Testament manuscripts by Johann Martin Augustin Scholz, who slightly examined the whole manuscript.

It was examined and described by Giuseppe Cozza-Luzi.
C. R. Gregory saw the manuscript in 1886. Herman C. Hoskier collated the text of the Apocalypse.

Formerly it was labeled by 161a, 198p, and 69r. In 1908 Gregory gave the number 628 to it.

It was examined and described by Ernesto Feron and Fabiano Battaglini.

The manuscript currently is housed at the Vatican Library (Ottobonianus gr. 258), at Rome.

See also 

 List of New Testament minuscules
 Biblical manuscript
 Textual criticism

References

Further reading 
 Herman C. Hoskier, Concerning the Text of the Apocalypse: Collation of All Existing Available Greek Documents with the Standard Text of Stephen’s Third Edition Together with the Testimony of Versions, Commentaries and Fathers. 1 vol. (London: Bernard Quaritch, Ltd., 1929), pp. 223–226. (for r)

Greek New Testament minuscules
14th-century biblical manuscripts
Manuscripts of the Vatican Library